Rypin  is a town in north-central Poland, in Kuyavian-Pomeranian Voivodeship, about 50 km east of Toruń.  It is the capital of Rypin County.  Population is 16,950 (2009).

History

Rypin was founded in the Middle Ages, and was part of Poland since the establishment of the state in the 10th century. From the 11th century it was the seat of a local castellany, and from the 14th century it was a county seat. It was granted town rights in the early 14th century, and afterwards it was a royal town of the Polish Crown, administratively located in the Dobrzyń Land in the Inowrocław Voivodeship in the Greater Poland Province of the Polish Crown. In the early 14th century, local dukes of the Polish Piast dynasty founded a hospital in Rypin to commemorate their deceased father Duke Siemowit of Dobrzyń. In 1352, the hospital was granted various privileges by Duke Władysław the Hunchback.

World War II
During the German invasion of Poland, which started World War II in September 1939, the town was invaded and then occupied by Germany until 1945. The Polish population was subjected to an extensive genocidal campaign. In September 1939, a German police prison was established in the town, and in October 1939, the German police and Selbstschutz carried out mass arrests of local Poles. Hundreds of arrested Poles were interrogated and then murdered on the spot and buried in nearby Skrwilno, during the German-perpetrated Intelligenzaktion. Among the victims were 96 Polish teachers and school principals from the town and county. Many local Poles were also murdered during large massacres carried out by the Germans in Skrwilno in October and November 1939. In 1944 the occupiers burned the victims' bodies in attempt to cover up the crime committed in Skrwilno. Poles were also murdered in other places in Rypin, and around 200 Poles from the town and county were massacred in the nearby village of Rusinowo. In 1939–1942, the Germans also expelled over 5,100 Poles from the town. Most of the expelled Poles were imprisoned in a transit camp in Toruń and then deported to the General Government (German-occupied central Poland), as their houses were handed over to German colonists as part of the Lebensraum policy. According to a Gestapo document from 1942, many remaining Poles fled from Rypin trying to avoid signing to the Deutsche Volksliste, however, many Poles eventually signed under the threat of deportation to German concentration camps. A transit camp for Poles expelled from nearby villages in 1942 was operated in the town. Rypin was liberated by Soviet Army end 1944.

People 
 Andrzej Fałkowski (born 1959), Polish army officer 
 Chaja Goldstein (1908–1999), dancer and singer
 Ivor Mairants (1908–1998), jazz and classical guitarist
 Zbigniew Sosnowski (born 1963), politician
 Jacob Talmon (1916–1980), Professor of Modern History at the Hebrew University of Jerusalem
 Faustin E. Wirkus (1896–1945), American marine

Sport 
 Lech Rypin - football club

Gallery

See also 
Near to Rypin is lake Urszulewo.

References

External links

 Official town webpage

Cities and towns in Kuyavian-Pomeranian Voivodeship
Rypin County